Bumera is a ward in Tarime District, Mara Region of northern Tanzania, East Africa. In 2016 the Tanzania National Bureau of Statistics report there were 10,594 people in the ward, from 9,601 in 2012.

Villages / neighborhoods 
The ward has 4 villages and 28 hamlets.

 Kitenga
 Buguta
 Kenyabwiri
 Kurumwa
 Kwiraha
 Kyeya
 Mekoma
 Nyerema
 Ryamoncho
 Senta
 Kiterere
 Bangura
 Butobori
 Sakaryakanya
 Sookologi
 Turugeti
 Gwiko
 Mabute
 Mang'ore
 Nguku
 Nyatekere
 Runyerere
 Songambele
 Kwisarara
 Bukiro
 Bunyama
 Kegomba
 Mahirinya
 Nyakunguru
 Nyarero
 Senta

References

Tarime District
Mara Region